Vânia Sofia de Sousa Silva (born 8 June 1980 in Leiria, Pinhal Litoral) is a female hammer thrower from Portugal. Her personal best throw is 69.55 metres, achieved in May 2011 in Vila Real de Santo António, Portugal. She competed at the World Championships in 2001, 2003, 2007, 2009 and 2011 as well as the Olympic Games in 2004, 2008 and 2012 without reaching the final.

Achievements

References

External links
 
 

1980 births
Living people
Portuguese female hammer throwers
Athletes (track and field) at the 2004 Summer Olympics
Athletes (track and field) at the 2008 Summer Olympics
Athletes (track and field) at the 2012 Summer Olympics
Olympic athletes of Portugal
People from Leiria
Sportspeople from Leiria District